Larry A. Martin (born June 20, 1957) is a Republican and a former member of the South Carolina Senate, representing the 2nd District since 1992 until 2017. In 2012, he was named Chairman of the Senate Judiciary Committee. He previously served in the South Carolina House of Representatives from 1979 through 1992. He was the youngest member of the SC House for six years, and his thirty-eight years of total service in the General Assembly is a record for any member from Pickens County. Martin is believed to have been the only non-lawyer to serve as chairman of the Senate Judiciary Committee. He was a leader in enacting tougher domestic violence laws, ethics reform, tort reform, stronger DUI laws, and more executive control of state agencies.

Personal
Martin graduated from Pickens High School and attended Tri-County Technical College. Martin was employed by Alice Manufacturing for thirty-six years and retired in 2018. Martin is married to Susan Lynn Evatt and they have three children and five grandchildren.

Community Involvement
Martin attends Pickens First Baptist Church, where he has served as Deacon, Church Moderator, and Sunday School Teacher.

Martin has served President of Pickens County United Way (1983), as the Chairman of the Governor's School-to-Work Council(1997–99) and as the Chairman of the Tax Study Committee(1998). In addition, he has served as a member of the advisory committee of Pickens First National Bank, the Economic Development Committee of the [http://www.slcatlanta.org/ Southern Legislative Conference.  In retirement, Martin is serving on the Prisma Health Baptist Easley Hospital Foundation Board, the Pickens County Cancer Society Board, and the county's advisory board for Upstate Warriors Solution.

Awards
 Outstanding Young Men of America, 1979
 Who's Who in American Politics, 1981–82, 1983–84
 Personalities of the South, 1982–83
 National Federation of Independent Businesses "Guardian of Small Business" Award, 1999;
 S.C. Chamber of Commerce Public Servant of the Year, 2002;
 S.C. Association of Counties "Guardian of Home Rule" Award, 2003;
 Anderson-Oconee-Pickens Area Mental Health "Patrick B. Harris Humanitarian Award for Public Serv.," 2003
 2004 Legislator of the Year Award by the National Federation of the Blind of S.C.
 Legislator of the Year for the Senate by the S.C. Human Services Providers Association, 2005
 National Alliance on Mental Illness "Mental Illness Champion 2006"
 Greenville Hospital System Children's Hospital Development Council "Legislative Advocacy Award for 2006"
 S.C. Commission for the Blind Legislator of the Year, 2006
 Conservation Voters of S.C., 2006 "Conservation Champion"
 S.C. Manufacturers Alliance "Defender of Manufacturing 2007" Award
 Fraternal Order of Police, "2007 Senator of the Year"
 S.C. Apartment Association, "2007 Legislator of the Year"
 Home Builders Association of S.C., "2008 Hammer & Trowel Award"
 Palmetto Family Council, "2008 Legislator of the Year"
 Special recognition of service by S.C. Baptist Convention, Nov. 2008
 S.C. REALTORS, "2009 Legislator of the Year"
 S.C. Education Association Friend of Education, 2011
 SC Farm Bureau Legislator of the Year Award, 2012
 MADD 2013 Legislator of the Year
 SC Sheriff's Association Legislator of the Year 2013
 Behavior Health Services Legislator of the Year 2013
 United Way SC Common Good Award for Volunteerism 2014
 SC League of Women Voters Issues and Action Award 2016
 SC Victim Assistance Network Public Service Award for combatting Domestic Violence 2016
 Order of the Palmetto 2016 by Governor Haley
 2017 Public Servant of the Year, Upstate Forever
 2017 Duke Energy Citizenship & Service Award by the Greater Easley Chamber of Commerce

External links

 SenLarryMartin.com campaign website
Project Vote Smart - Senator Larry A. Martin (SC) profile
Follow the Money - Larry A. Martin
2006 2004 2002 2000 1996 campaign contributions

South Carolina state senators
Members of the South Carolina House of Representatives
1957 births
Living people
21st-century American politicians